The 2006–07 Barys Astana season was the 8th season in the Kazakhstan Hockey Championship and the 3rd season in the First League of the Russian Ice Hockey Championship, in parallel.

Kazakhstan Hockey Championship

Standings

References

Barys Astana seasons
Barys